Aq Mahdi (also Romanized as Āq Mahdī) is a village in Kuhpayeh Rural District Rural District, in the Central District of Bardaskan County, Razavi Khorasan Province, Iran. At the 2006 census, its population was 124, in 31 families.

See also 

 List of cities, towns and villages in Razavi Khorasan Province

References 

Populated places in Bardaskan County